Fosaprepitant (Emend for Injection (US), Ivemend (EU)) is an antiemetic medication, administered intravenously. It is a prodrug of aprepitant.

Fosaprepitant was developed by Merck & Co. and was approved for medical use in the United States, and in the European Union in January 2008.

References

External links 
 

Antiemetics
CYP3A4 inhibitors
NK1 receptor antagonists
Prodrugs
Merck & Co. brands
Morpholines
Phosphoramidates
Triazoles
Trifluoromethyl compounds
Fluoroarenes